The 2012 FIM Speedway World Cup (SWC) was the twelfth FIM Speedway World Cup, the annual international speedway world championship tournament. It took place between 7 July and 14 July 2012 and involved eight national teams. Six teams were seeded through to the tournament and two qualification rounds were held in April and May 2012 to determine the final place. As host nation, Sweden were seeded to the Final.

Qualification
{| width=100%
|rowspan=2 width=50% valign=top|
The top six nations from the 2011 Speedway World Cup (Poland, Australia, Sweden, Denmark, Russia and Great Britain) were granted automatic qualification with Sweden given a birth in the final as host nation. The remaining two places were divided among two qualifying rounds. Qualifying Round One was hosted in Herxheim, Germany, and Qualifying Round Two was hosted in Ljubljana, Slovenia. Germany and the USA qualified to the Tournament.

 Qualifying Round One
  Herxheim
 22 April 2012

 Qualifying Round Two
  Ljubljana
 7 May 2012

Qualified teams

Tournament

Semi-finals

Race off

Final 
(full details)

Final classification

See also
 2012 Speedway Grand Prix
 2012 Team Speedway Junior World Championship

References

 
2012
2012 in speedway